The Channel Fleet and originally known as the Channel Squadron was the Royal Navy formation of warships that defended the waters of the English Channel from 1854 to 1909 and 1914 to 1915.

History
Throughout the course of Royal Navy's history there had been different squadrons stationed in home waters. One of the earliest known naval formations to be based at Plymouth was called the Western Squadron which was the forerunner of the Channel Squadron that was later known as the Channel Fleet. In 1650 Captain William Penn, Commander-in-Chief, was charged with guarding the Channel from Beachy Head to Lands End with six ships. This system continued following the Restoration. It was the start of what was to become a Western Squadron. From 1690 the squadron operated out of Plymouth Dockyard during wartime periods, which was for most of the 18th century and early 19th century. In 1854 The Channel Squadron, sometimes known as the Particular Service Squadron, was established. The Channel Squadron only became a permanent formation in 1858.

During the 19th century, as the French developed Cherbourg as a base for steam-powered ships, the Royal Navy developed Portland Harbour as a base for the fleet. The harbour was built between 1849 and 1872 when the Royal Navy created a breakwater made of blocks from local quarries on the Isle of Portland.

With the amelioration of Anglo-French relations, and the German challenge towards 1900, the need for a Channel Formation diminished and the main European naval arena shifted to the North Sea. Admiral Sir Arthur Wilson was officially "Senior Officer in Command of the Channel Squadron" from 1901 to 1903. His subordinate flag officer in that squadron was the Second-in-Command, who commanded a division of battleships. For the period 1858 to 1903 the Channel squadron was often incorrectly referred to as the Channel Fleet.

On 17 April 1903 The Right Hon. Lord Charles Beresford was appointed Vice-Admiral Commanding, Channel Squadron. On 6 May 1903 Admiral Beresford was informed by the Admiralty "that for the future the Channel Squadron shall be known as the Channel Fleet."  On 14 December 1904 the Channel Fleet was re-styled the 'Atlantic Fleet' and the Home Fleet became the 'Channel Fleet'.

On 24 March 1909, under a fleet re-organisation, the Channel Fleet became the 2nd Division of the Home Fleet.

Rear and Vice-Admiral, Particular Service Squadron
 Vice-Admiral Sir Charles Napier, (1854-1856)
 Rear-Admiral, Henry Chads, (1854-1856)
 Rear-Admiral Sir Richard Saunders Dundas, (1856-1857) 
 Rear-Admiral Sir Michael Seymour. (1856-1857)

Senior Officers in Command of the Channel Squadron
Post holders have included:
 Vice Admiral Sir Charles Fremantle (1859–1860)
 Vice Admiral Sir Robert Stopford (1860–1861)
 Vice Admiral Sir Robert Smart (1861–1863)
 Vice Admiral Sir Sydney Dacres (1863–1866)
 Vice Admiral Sir Hastings Yelverton (1866–1867)
 Vice Admiral Frederick Warden (1867–1868)
 Vice Admiral Sir Thomas Symonds (1868–1870)
 Vice Admiral Sir Hastings Yelverton (July 1870-October 1870)
 Vice Admiral Sir George Wellesley (1870–1871)
 Vice Admiral Sir Geoffrey Hornby (1871–1874)
 Vice Admiral Sir Beauchamp Seymour (1874–1877)
 Vice Admiral Lord John Hay (1877–1879)
 Vice Admiral Lord Hood (1880–1882)
 Vice Admiral Sir William Dowell (1882–1883)
 Vice Admiral The Duke of Edinburgh (1883–1884)
 Vice Admiral Sir Algernon de Horsey (1884–1885)
 Vice Admiral Charles Fellowes (1885–1886)
 Vice Admiral Sir William Hewett (1886–1888)
 Vice Admiral Sir John Baird (1888–1890)
 Vice Admiral Sir Michael Culme-Seymour (1890–1892)
 Vice Admiral Sir Henry Fairfax (1892–1894)
 Vice Admiral Sir Robert Fitzroy (1894–1895)
 Vice Admiral Lord Walter Kerr (1895–1897)
 Vice Admiral Sir Henry Stephenson (1897–1898)
 Vice Admiral Sir Harry Rawson (1898–1901)
 Vice Admiral Sir Arthur Wilson (1901–1903)
 Vice-Admiral Lord Charles Beresford (1903-4)

Second-in-Command Channel Squadron
Post holders included:
 Rear-Admiral Henry Chads, 1 October 1869.
 Rear-Admiral William M. Dowell, 1877
 Rear-Admiral Henry Boys, 1878
 Rear-Admiral The Hon. Henry C. Glyn, 20 June 1881.
 Rear-Admiral Sir Francis W. Sullivan, 14 August 1882
 Rear-Admiral John C. Wilson, 1 April 1883
 Rear-Admiral William H. Whyte, 13 May 1884
 Rear-Admiral Algernon C. F. Heneage, 3 July 1885 – 7 August 1886
 Rear-Admiral The Hon.Edmund R. Fremantle , 9 August 1886
 Rear-Admiral Charles J. Rowley, 18 August 1887
 Rear-Admiral St. George Caulfield d′Arcy-Irvine, 1 September 1888
 Rear-Admiral Richard E. Tracey, 12 September 1889
 Rear-Admiral Loftus F. Jones, 12 September 1890
 Rear-Admiral Edward S. Adeane, 15 September 1891
 Rear-Admiral Edward H. Seymour, 16 September 1892 – 25 April 1894
 Rear-Admiral Alfred T. Dale, 25 April 1894 – 20 April 1895
 Rear-Admiral Arthur H. Alington, 1 May 1895
 Rear-Admiral Armand T. Powlett, 1 May 1896 – 19 May 1897 
 Rear-Admiral John Fellowes, 19 May 1897
 Rear-Admiral John W. Brackenbury, 1 June 1898
 Rear-Admiral Arthur D. Fanshawe, 1 June 1899 – 31 May 1900
 Rear-Admiral Albert B. Jenkings, 1 June 1900 - 5 June 1901
 Rear-Admiral Sir William A. D. Acland, Bart., 5 June 1901 – September 1901

Commanders-in-Chief Channel Fleet
 Admiral Sir Arthur Wilson 14 December 1904
 Admiral Lord Charles Beresford (1907–1909)
Note Channel Fleet is re-named Atlantic Fleet 1909-1914
 Vice Admiral Sir Lewis Bayly (August, 1914- 17 January 1915)
 Vice Admiral  The Hon. Sir. Alexander E. Bethell (17 January 1915)

Second-in-Command Channel Fleet
Post holders included:
 Rear-Admiral the Hon. Assheton G. Curzon-Howe: September 1901, - 5 June 1903
 Rear-Admiral the Hon. Hedworth Lambton: 5 June 1903 - 25 June 1904
 Rear-Admiral Francis C. B. Bridgeman: 25 June 1904 - May, 1905
 Rear-Admiral Charles J. Barlow: May, 1905 - December, 1905
 Vice-Admiral Sir Arthur W. Moore:  December, 1905 - 5 December 1906
 Vice-Admiral the Hon. Assheton G. Curzon-Howe: 5 December 1906 - 23 February 1907
 Vice-Admiral Sir Reginald N. Custance: 23 February 1907 - 12 June 1908
 Vice-Admiral Sir A. Berkeley Milne: 12 June 1908

Rear-Admirals in the Channel Fleet
Post holders included:
 Rear-Admiral Sir Richard Poore, : February, 1905 - 16 November 1905
 Rear-Admiral Robert L. Groome:  16 November 1905 - 16 November 1906
 Rear-Admiral George A. Callaghan: 16 November 1906 - 5, April 1907
 Rear-Admiral Robert S. Lowry: 5, April, 1907 - 1 October 1907
 Rear-Admiral Francis J. Foley: 1 October 1907 - 1 October 1908
 Rear-Admiral James Startin: 1 October 1908 - 9 October 1909

Components

1895
Distribution of the Fleet first included:

1901 to 1904
Distribution of the Fleet first included:
Of note:As the Channel Squadron - renamed The Channel Fleet, September, 1901.

1905 to 1907
Distribution of the Fleet first included:

1907 to 1909
Distribution of the Fleet first included:

1914 to 1915
Of note: On 8 August 1914, ships from the pre-war Second and Third Fleets were organised into the Channel Fleet.
Distribution of the Fleet first included:

In literature

The Channel Fleet features in several historical novels about the Royal Navy, notably Hornblower and the Hotspur by C. S. Forester, in which Forester's fictional hero becomes a favourite of the real Channel Fleet commander, Admiral William Cornwallis.  The fleet also features in several of the Aubrey–Maturin novels by Patrick O'Brian.

The novel Billy Budd by Herman Melville is set on board ships of the Channel Fleet, in the immediate aftermath of the Spithead and Nore mutinies of 1797.

In the novel The War of the Worlds, the Channel Fleet protects the huge mass of refugee shipping escaping from the Essex coast in the face of the Martian onslaught.

References

Footnotes

Sources
 Annal, David; Collins, Audrey (2012). Birth, Marriage and Death Records: A Guide for Family Historians. Casemate Publishers. .
 Archives, The National. (1859-1910) "Admiralty: Channel Squadron and Fleet: Correspondence". discovery.nationalarchives.gov.uk. National Archives UK. ADM 144.
 Black, Jeremy, (2011) "THE ROYAL NAVY AND THE FRENCH WARS: THE LONG-TERM BACKGROUND: University of Exeter" (PDF). napoleonicsociety.com. The Napoleonic Society.
 Davis, Peter. "The Times newspaper on the Channel Squadron, 1858-1862". www.pdavis.nl. Peter Davis.
 Harley, Simon; Lovell, Tony. (2018) "Channel Fleet (Royal Navy) - The Dreadnought Project". www.dreadnoughtproject.org. Harley and Lovell.
 Harley, Simon; Lovell, Tony. (2017) "Channel Squadron (Royal Navy) - The Dreadnought Project". www.dreadnoughtproject.org. Harley & Lovell.
 Loney, William. RN. "Channel Squadron, the Naval Intelligence column of the Times newspaper refer to the activities of the Squadron in the period 1858-1862". www.pdavis.nl/Channel.php. William Loney.
 Mackesy, Piers (1964). The War for America: 1775-1783. Lincoln, Nebraska, USA: U of Nebraska Press. .
 Mackie, Colin. (2017) "Royal Navy Senior Appointments from 1865" (PDF). gulabin.com. Colin Mackie.
 Ranft, Bryan (1995). The Oxford illustrated history of the Royal Navy. Oxford, England: Oxford University Press. .
 Royal Museums Greenwich. "Royal Navy Dockyards: Plymouth". (2017). rmg.co.uk. Royal Museums Greenwich.
 Saunders, Andrew (1997). Book of Channel defences. London: Batsford [u.a.] .
 Watson, Dr Graham. (2015) "Royal Navy Organisation and Ship Deployments 1900-1914". www.naval-history.net. Gordon Smith.
 Watson, Dr Graham. (2015) "Royal Navy Organisation and Ship Deployment, Inter-War Years 1914-1918". www.naval-history.net. Gordon Smith.
 Whitaker's Almanacks (1900 - 1909).
 Weigley, Russell F. (2004). The Age of Battles: The Quest for Decisive Warfare from Breitenfeld to Waterloo. Indiana University Press. .

Further reading

External links 
 

Fleets of the Royal Navy
Military history of the English Channel
Military units and formations established in 1858
Military units and formations disestablished in 1909
1858 establishments in England